The 1918–19 SK Rapid Wien season was the 21st season in club history.

Squad

Squad and statistics

Squad statistics

Fixtures and results

League

Cup

References

1918-19 Rapid Wien Season
Rapid
Austrian football championship-winning seasons